Jollity is the third studio album by Irish pop band Pugwash. It was released in Ireland by 1969 Records on 23 September 2005 and in Australia by Karmic Hit later the same year. It was released in the UK on 31 October 2006. Two singles were released from the album: "It's Nice to Be Nice" and "This Could Be Good".

Track listing

Personnel 

 Thomas Walsh: vocals, backing vocals, acoustic guitar, rhythm guitar, electric guitar, lead guitar, piano, pianet, organ, tremolo guitar, Yamaha SY-2 synth, glockenspiel, Novatron, Mellotron, saxophone, vibes, samples, tambourine, shakers, sleighbells
 Keith Farrell: bass guitar, lead guitar, rhythm guitar, acoustic guitar, Wurlitzer, samples, backing vocals
 Duncan Maitland: Piano, Mellotron, synths, drumbox, Wurlitzer, acoustic guitar, Vox organ, Moog, grand piano, tack piano, samples, vibes, harpsichord, 12-string acoustic guitar, backing vocals
 Aidan O'Grady: drums
 Dave Gregory: grand piano, acoustic guitar, lead guitar, EBow guitar, Mellotron, sitar, tremolo guitar, slide guitar, 12-string Rickenbacker, pipe organ 
 Ger Eaton: Hammond organ
 Shaun McGee: bass, backing vocals
 Tosh Flood: banjo, harpsichord, organ, vibes, rhythm guitar, lead guitar, backing vocals
 Graham Hopkins: drums, guitar noise sample
 John Boyle: drums
 Eric Matthews: trumpet, flugelhorn, backing vocals
 Daragh Bohan: guitar sample, fuzz chorus guitar
 Richard Dodd: cello
 Q: EBow guitar
 Stephen Farrell: slide guitar
 Fran King: backing vocals
 Derren Dempsey: drum, guitar noise sample
 Section Quartet: strings

References

2005 albums
Pugwash (band) albums